The 1981 Sun Belt Conference men's basketball tournament was held February 27–March 1 at the Jacksonville Coliseum in Jacksonville, Florida.

In a rematch of the 1980 final, VCU repeated as tournament champions by defeating UAB in the championship game, 62–61, to win their second Sun Belt men's basketball tournament.

The Rams, in turn, received an automatic bid for the 1981 NCAA tournament, where they advanced to the second round. Runner-up UAB received an at-large bid; the Blazers ultimately won two games before losing to Indiana in the regional semifinals.

Format
With the Sun Belt's forced departure of New Orleans prior to the season, the conference's membership decreased to seven teams. In turn, the top-seeded team was given a bye into the semifinal round. All other teams, again seeded based on regular season conference records, entered the tournament in the quarterfinal round.

The entire tournament was played at the Jacksonville Coliseum in Jacksonville, Florida.

Bracket

References

Sun Belt Conference men's basketball tournament
Tournament
Sun Belt Conference men's basketball tournament
Sun Belt Conference men's basketball tournament
Sun Belt Conference men's basketball tournament